Cody Carson Pfister (born August 7, 1990) is an American mixed martial artist who competes in the Lightweight division. A professional competitor since 2009, he has competed for the UFC, Bellator, Shark Fights, King of the Cage, and the Resurrection Fighting Alliance.

Mixed martial arts career

Ultimate Fighting Championship
After an unsuccessful bid to get on The Ultimate Fighter: Live and an 11–3–1 run on the regional circuit, Pfister signed with the UFC in 2015.

Pfister faced James Moontasri at UFC Fight Night: Henderson vs. Thatch on February 14, 2015, replacing Jake Lindsey. Pfister lost the fight by submission in the second round.

Pfister then faced Yosdenis Cedeno at UFC 189 on July 11, 2015. He won the fight by unanimous decision.

Pfister faced Sage Northcutt on December 10, 2015 at UFC Fight Night 80. Despite winning the first round, Pfister lost by submission via guillotine choke in the second.

Pfister next faced Scott Holtzman on July 13, 2016 at UFC Fight Night 91. He lost the fight via unanimous decision and was subsequently released from the promotion.

Bellator MMA
Pfister made his promotional debut for Bellator against Jonathan Gary at Bellator 174 on March 3, 2017. He won the fight via submission in the first round, and in his post-fight interview, announced his retirement from MMA. However he has promised to return in his own promotion, Fist Fight Night.

Regional circuit
Despite announcing his retirement, Pfister faced Charles Bennett at Fist Fight Night 2 on September 30, 2017. He won the fight via first-round submission.

He then faced Wu Haotian at Kunlun Fight MMA 16 on October 28, 2017. He won the fight via unanimous decision.

Next he faced Kyle Prepolec at BTC 5 on March 9, 2019. He lost the fight via unanimous decision.

He then faced Adam Assenza at BTC 9 on February 29, 2020. He lost the fight via split decision.

Pfister was next scheduled to face Tom Shoaff at Rage in the Cage 78 on January 30, 2021. However, Shoaff withdrew from the bout and was replaced with Sterling Lenz. Pfister won the fight via first-minute submission.

Pfister was then scheduled to face Trey Ogden at FAC 7 on March 5, 2021. However, Pfister withdrew from the bout and was replaced with Darius Estell.

Pfister faced Don Shainis for the FAC Lightweight Championship on May 6, 2022 at FAC 13. He lost the bout via TKO stoppage in the first round.

Mixed martial arts record

|-
|Loss
|align=center|16–9–1
|Don Shainis
|TKO (punches)
|FAC 13
|
|align=center|1
|align=center|2:55
|Independence, Missouri, United States
|
|-
| Win
| align=center|16–8–1
| Sterling Lenz
| Submission (rear-naked choke)
| Rage in the Cage: OKC 78
| 
| align=center| 1
| align=center| 0:50
| Lawton, Oklahoma, United States
|
|-
| Loss
| align=center|15–8–1
| Adam Assenza
| Decision (split)
| BTC 9: Rampage
| 
| align=center| 3
| align=center| 5:00
| Kitchener, Ontario, Canada
|
|-
| Loss
| align=center|15–7–1
| Kyle Prepolec
| Decision (unanimous)
| BTC 5: Typhoon
| 
| align=center| 3
| align=center| 5:00
| Windsor, Ontario, Canada
|
|-
| Win
| align=center|15–6–1
| Haotian Wu
| Decision (unanimous)
| Kunlun Fight MMA 16/Australian Fighting Championship 22
| 
| align=center| 3
| align=center| 5:00
| Melbourne, Australia
|
|-
| Win
| align=center|14–6–1
| Charles Bennett
| Submission (rear-naked choke)
| Fist Fight Night 2: Pfister vs Felony
| 
| align=center| 1
| align=center| 2:36
| Amarillo, Texas
|
|-
|Win
|align=center|13–6–1
|Jonathan Gary
|Submission (rear-naked choke)
|Bellator 174
|
|align=center|1
|align=center|4:04
|Thackerville, Oklahoma, United States
|  
|-
|Loss
|align=center|12–6–1
|Scott Holtzman
|Decision (unanimous)
|UFC Fight Night: McDonald vs. Lineker
|
|align=center|3
|align=center|5:00
|Sioux Falls, South Dakota, United States
|  
|-
| Loss
| align=center|12–5–1
| Sage Northcutt
|Submission (guillotine choke)
|UFC Fight Night: Namajunas vs. VanZant
|
|align=center|2
|align=center|0:41
|Las Vegas, Nevada, United States
|
|-
| Win
| align=center|12–4–1
| Yosdenis Cedeno
|Decision (unanimous)
|UFC 189 
|
|align=center|3
|align=center|5:00
|Las Vegas, Nevada, United States
|
|-
| Loss
| align=center|11–4–1
| James Moontasri
| Submission (rear-naked choke)
| UFC Fight Night: Henderson vs. Thatch
|
|align=center|2
|align=center|1:49
|Broomfield, Colorado, United States
|
|-
| Win
| align=center|11–3–1
| Brett Glass
| Submission (rear-naked choke)
| TAC: Top Alliance Combat 3
| 
| align=center|1
| align=center|2:50
| McDonough, Georgia, United States
|
|-
| Win
| align=center|10–3–1
| Ed Cline Jr.
| TKO (punches)
| XFL: Xtreme Fight Night 15
| 
| align=center|1
| align=center|1:18
| Tulsa, Oklahoma, United States
|
|-
| Win
| align=center|9–3–1
| Mitchell Hale
| Decision (unanimous)
| Xtreme Fighting League: Vengeance
| 
| align=center|5
| align=center|5:00
| Grant, Oklahoma, United States
|
|-
| Win
| align=center|8–3–1
| Codale Ford
| Decision (unanimous)
| XFL: Xtreme Fight Night 12
| 
| align=center|5
| align=center|3:00
| Tulsa, Oklahoma, United States
|
|-
| Draw
| align=center|7–3–1
| Ed Cline Jr.
| Draw (majority)
| XFL: Xtreme Fight Night 11 
| 
| align=center|5
| align=center|3:00
| Tulsa, Oklahoma, United States
|
|-
| Win
| align=center|7–3
| Isaias Martinez
| TKO (punches)
| SF 21: Shark Fights 21
| 
| align=center|1
| align=center|4:09
| Lubbock, Texas, United States
|
|-
| Win
| align=center|6–3
| Brian Castillo
| Submission (rear-naked choke)
| MBP: Sun City Battle 2
| 
| align=center|1
| align=center|2:13
| El Paso, Texas, United States
|
|-
| Win
| align=center|5–3
| James Gabriel
| Submission (rear-naked choke)
| DRCWC: Throwdown Showdown 11
| 
| align=center|1
| align=center|0:47
| Liberal, Kansas, United States
|
|-
| Loss
| align=center|4–3
| Tim Means
| Submission (rear-naked choke)
| KOTC: Kingpin
| 
| align=center|1
| align=center|2:15
| Lubbock, Texas, United States
| 
|-
|Loss
| align=center|4–2
| Derek Campos
| Submission (rear-naked choke)
| Undisputed MMA: Undisputed MMA 1
| 
| align=center|1
| align=center|2:55
| Amarillo, Texas, United States
|
|-
| Loss
| align=center|4–1
| Anselmo Luna
| Decision (unanimous)
| 24/7 Entertainment 1: Professional Cage Fighting
| 
| align=center|3
| align=center|3:00
| Midland, Texas, United States
|
|-
| Win
| align=center|4–0
| Mitchell Hale
| Decision (split)
| SF 12: Shark Fights 12
| 
| align=center| 3
| align=center| 5:00
| Amarillo, Texas United States
|
|-
| Win
| align=center|3–0
| Gino Davila
| Decision (unanimous)
| SF 10: Shark Fights 10
| 
| align=center| 3
| align=center| 3:00
| Lubbock, Texas, United States
| 
|-
| Win
| align=center|2–0
| Severo Padilla
| TKO (punches)
| SF 9: Shark Fights 9
| 
| align=center| 1
| align=center| 2:52
| Amarillo, Texas, United States
|
|-
| Win
| align=center|1–0
| Jeremy Hinojosa
| KO (punches)
| SF 8: Shark Fights 8
| 
| align=center| 1
| align=center| 0:49
| Lubbock, Texas, United States
|

Amateur mixed martial arts record

| Win
| align=center|1–0
| Brenton Taylor
| Decision (unanimous)
| XFL: Collision Course
| 
| align=center| 3
| align=center| 2:00
| Tulsa, Oklahoma, United States
|

See also
 List of current UFC fighters
 List of male mixed martial artists

References

External links
 
 

1990 births
Living people
American wushu practitioners
American male mixed martial artists
Lightweight mixed martial artists
Sportspeople from Amarillo, Texas
Mixed martial artists from Texas
Mixed martial artists utilizing wushu
Mixed martial artists utilizing Brazilian jiu-jitsu
Ultimate Fighting Championship male fighters
American practitioners of Brazilian jiu-jitsu